Donald Michel Bakker is a Canadian from Penticton who made headlines when he was the first person to be tried in Canada for child prostitution crimes committed in another country. Bakker was charged under the sex tourism law which is used to punish those who use child prostitutes while outside Canada.

In 2004, he pleaded not guilty, claiming that Canada has no right to police people while they are outside its jurisdiction. Much of the evidence against him was videotapes that Bakker himself made.  Some of these videos show Bakker torturing Vancouver area prostitutes with metal clips and electric cords.  Other videos show him having sex with girls in Cambodia, the oldest of whom was 12.

On June 1, 2005, he pleaded guilty to 10 counts of sexual assault to avoid a trial.  The Solicitor and Crown prosecutor jointly asked for a 10-year prison sentence. Bakker had already served 18 months, which would count as double time, meaning he will have seven more years in prison.  He is eligible for parole within one and a half years.

On June 1st 2012, Donald Bakker was released from prison, and now resides in Abbotsford, British Columbia.

External links
CBC.ca – Canada's sex tourism law faces first test
CBC.ca – Vancouver man pleads guilty to overseas sex charges
CanadianChristianity.com – Alleged attacker a World Vision child sponsor
Members.shaw.ca – Neighbours shocked by alleged crimes
 Dateline story that involves Donald Bakker
 Released and moves to Penticton BC
 Moved to Abbotsford.

Canadian people convicted of child sexual abuse
Living people
Year of birth missing (living people)
Canadian prisoners and detainees
Prisoners and detainees of Canada
People from Penticton